Claude Michael Fiocca (1931 – March 31, 2001) was an American politician who was a member of the Ohio House of Representatives.

References

Members of the Ohio House of Representatives
1931 births
2001 deaths
20th-century American politicians